Gwangju Metro Line 1 is a rapid transit line in Gwangju, South Korea, operated by the Gwangju Metropolitan Rapid Transit Corporation (GRTC, or Gwangju Metro). It connects Nokdong station in Dong-gu at its eastern terminus to Pyeongdong station in Gwangsan-gu in the west, via the central business district and Gwangju Airport. On maps, it is designated by teal (●).

The line began operations in 2004, making Gwangju the fifth South Korean city with a rapid transit system.

History
 August 28, 1996: Ground breaking ceremony for the Line 1
 April 28, 2004: Line 1 partially opened (Nokdong ↔ Sangmu)
 April 11, 2008: Line 1 fully opened (Nokdong ↔ Pyeongdong)

Stations
As of 2021 Line 1 consists of twenty stations. Most trains operate between Pyeongdong and Sotae, with about one service per hour continuing to Nokdong station.

Plan to extend Line 1
The Gwangju City Government has a plan to extend the current Line 1 southward to Hwasun and northward to Naju. Recently, the Presidential Committee on Balanced National Development promised to include the Line 1 extension in its '5+2 extensive economic zone' project.

See also
Transportation in South Korea

References

Gwangju
Railway lines in South Korea
1
Railway lines opened in 2004
Airport rail links in South Korea